Albarracina is a genus of tussock moths in the family Erebidae.

Species
The following species are included in the genus.
Albarracina alluaudi Oberthür, 1922
Albarracina autumnalis Krüger, 1939
Albarracina baui Standfuss, 1890
Albarracina korbi Staudinger, 1883
Albarracina syriaca Standfuss, 1890
Albarracina warionis Oberthür, 1922

References

Natural History Museum Lepidoptera genus database

Lymantriinae
Moth genera